Morgan County Sheriff's House and Jail is a historic combined jail and residence located at Martinsville, Morgan County, Indiana.  It was built in 1890, and is a two-story, brick building with Italianate and Queen Anne  style design elements.  It has a cross-gable roof, arched openings, and terra cotta ornamentation.

It was listed on the National Register of Historic Places in 1996.

References

Jails on the National Register of Historic Places in Indiana
Italianate architecture in Indiana
Queen Anne architecture in Indiana
Government buildings completed in 1890
Buildings and structures in Morgan County, Indiana
National Register of Historic Places in Morgan County, Indiana
Jails in Indiana
Houses on the National Register of Historic Places in Indiana